The Suzuki Splash is a city car that was introduced to the market in 2008. It was jointly developed by Suzuki Motor Corporation and Opel GmbH, which market their version under the name of Agila. Its debut as a concept car took place at the 2006 Paris Motor Show, making its production form debut at the 2007 Frankfurt Motor Show.

Markets

Europe 
In the European market lineup, the Splash was positioned below the Swift and used a shortened wheelbase version of its chassis. In the Japanese market lineup, however, the car was situated between the Swift and the Suzuki Solio. The model was launched with three versions of petrol engines, a three-cylinder 1.0 liter and two four-cylinder 1.2 liter (1197 cc and 1242 cc) K engines, and a four-cylinder 1.3-liter version of Fiat's MultiJet turbo-diesel engine. The Splash was also marketed as the Vauxhall Agila in the United Kingdom and as the Opel Agila in other European markets. It has different front and rear end styling.

Japan 
The Splash was introduced to the Japanese market on 20 October 2008, available with the 1.2-litre engine.

India 
Maruti Suzuki released the Splash in India as Maruti Suzuki Ritz. Maruti Suzuki changed its name because the name "Splash" was already registered by Ford in that market. More than 200,000 Ritz were sold within the first 37 months of release.

In India, the Maruti Ritz is available in ten specifications; five equipment levels with either petrol or diesel engine options. The petrol variants are powered by Suzuki's 1.2 liter (1197 cc) K12M petrol engine. The mileage it delivers on city roads is around 14.5 km/L, and 18 km/L on highways. The diesel variants of Maruti Ritz are powered by Fiat's 1.3-liter Multijet turbodiesel engine. The mileage it delivers is 17.7 km/L in the city and on the highway: 21 km/L.

A refreshed Ritz was launched in India in 2012. This version sports a new ZDI variant, three new colors, and improved fuel efficiency.

The Maruti Suzuki Ritz 2015 model was launched with a redesigned trim. The technical specifications remain unchanged. As part of the upgrades the vehicle received a new front fascia with a new grille, headlamps and bumpers. The vehicle is also sports new optional alloy wheels, new seat upholstery, and a new infotainment system.

Others 
In Indonesia, the Splash was launched on 21 March 2010 and it was imported from India. It was initially offered only with manual transmission. The facelifted Splash was launched in the country on 27 April 2013 and also offered with automatic transmission. Sales ended in 2016.

In China, it was released by Changhe Suzuki towards the end of 2010. it was continued to available as Changhe Spla with 1.4-liter petrol engine until 2018 and this car was also offered in South American market. The Splash also went on sale in New Zealand in 2011.

Discontinuation 
The Splash was discontinued in Europe at the end of 2014. It was replaced by the second generation Ignis in early 2016. The Splash was also discontinued in Indonesia in June 2016, while the Ritz was discontinued in India in February 2017.

Gallery

References

External links
Official Suzuki Splash promotional site 
Suzuki Splash global site
Maruti Ritz In India

Splash
Front-wheel-drive vehicles
Cars introduced in 2008
City cars
Hatchbacks
Euro NCAP superminis
2010s cars